Marquess of the County of Bute, shortened in general usage to Marquess of Bute, is a title in the Peerage of Great Britain. It was created in 1796 for John Stuart, 4th Earl of Bute.

Family history
John Stuart was the member of a family that descended from John Stewart (1360–1449), Sheriff of Bute, a natural son of Robert II of Scotland and his mistress Moira Leitch, married to Janet Sympil and in 1407 to Elizabeth Graham. This John Stewart was granted the lands of Bute, Arran and Cumbrae by his father. He was known as the 'Black Stewart' because of his dark complexion; his brother John Stewart of Dundonald was known as the 'Red Stewart'. The grant of lands was confirmed in 1400 by a charter of Robert III.

About 1385, John Stewart of Bute was granted the hereditary office of Sheriff of Bute by his father Robert II. He died in 1449, aged 89. At about the time of Mary, Queen of Scots, the family adopted the spelling of 'Stuart', which she had used while living in France. James Stuart, seventh in descent from the Black Stewart, was created a Baronet, of Bute, in the Baronetage of Nova Scotia on 28 March 1627. His grandson, the third Baronet, represented Bute in the Parliament of Scotland and was one of the Commissioners that negotiated the Union between Scotland and England. On 14 April 1703, he was raised to the Peerage of Scotland as Earl of Bute, Viscount of Kingarth, and Lord Mount Stuart, Cumra and Inchmarnock. He was succeeded by his son, the 2nd Earl of Bute and 4th Baronet, who sat in the House of Lords as a Scottish Representative Peer and served as Lord-Lieutenant of Buteshire. On his early death, the titles passed to his son, the third Earl. He became a politician and favourite of George III and served as Prime Minister of Great Britain from 1762 to 1763. Lord Bute married Mary, a daughter of Edward Wortley Montagu and his wife the writer Lady Mary Wortley Montagu. In 1761, Lord Bute's wife Mary was raised to the Peerage of Great Britain in her own right as Baroness Mount Stuart, of Wortley in the County of York, with remainder to the heirs male of her body by her then husband Lord Bute. Her son became the first Marquess of Bute, whose eldest son and heir John Stuart, Lord Mount Stuart (who predeceased his father) married Lady Elizabeth Penelope, daughter and heiress of Patrick McDouall-Crichton, 6th Earl of Dumfries. Lord Mount Stuart's eldest son John succeeded his maternal grandfather as seventh Earl of Dumfries in 1803, and his paternal grandfather as second Marquess of Bute in 1814. In 1805, he assumed by Royal licence the additional surname of Crichton before Stuart. He was succeeded by his only child, the third Marquess. He was an antiquarian, scholar, philanthropist and architectural patron and also held the post of Lord-Lieutenant of Buteshire. It was the 3rd Marquess who in 1868 first converted to Roman Catholicism, since which time the family have remained of that faith. His son the fourth Marquess was also Lord-Lieutenant of Buteshire. His grandson, John Crichton-Stuart, 6th Marquess of Bute, succeeded his father and was Lord-Lieutenant of Buteshire from 1967 to 1975. As of 2021, the peerages are held by the latter's grandson, John Crichton-Stuart, 8th Marquess of Bute.

Bute family titles
The marquesses of Bute have important ancestors not only in Scotland but also in Wales, including the first Lord Herbert of Cardiff, son and heir of Richard Herbert of Ewyas. He was also created Earl of Pembroke. After the  Stuart Restoration, most of the Herbert family property was sold, and the rest was owned by Thomas, Viscount Windsor, who married Charlotte, the only child of Philip Herbert, 7th Earl of Pembroke. In 1766, Viscount Windsor's granddaughter, Charlotte Jane, was married to John Stuart, Lord Mount Stuart (1744-1814), the son and heir of the 3rd Earl of Bute, prime minister from 1762 to 1763, and through this marriage great estates in south Wales came into the Bute family. In 1776, sixteen years before he succeeded his father as Earl of Bute, he was raised to the Peerage of Great Britain in his own right as Baron Cardiff, of Cardiff Castle in the County of Glamorgan, in recognition of his substantial Welsh estates. In 1796, he was further honoured when he was created Earl of Windsor and Viscount Mountjoy, in the Isle of Wight, revivals of the titles once held by his wife's family, and Marquess of Bute. These titles are also in the Peerage of Great Britain.

Other offices and duties
The marquess of Bute is the hereditary keeper of Rothesay Castle, a privilege granted to the ancestor of the earls and marquesses of Bute, John Stewart, by Robert II during the 14th century. In this capacity, the Crichton-Stuart family had been responsible for the upkeep and restoration of the castle up until the 1960s.

This branch of the Stewart (also Stuart) family previously held the office of Hereditary High Steward of Scotland, an office now held by the duke of Rothesay, in his capacity as a direct descendant of the House of Stuart.

Other family members 
Many other members of the family have gained distinction. Robert Stuart, a younger son of the first Baronet, was created a Baronet in his own right in 1707. The Hon. James Stuart-Mackenzie, a younger son of the second Earl, succeeded to the Mackenzie estates through his paternal grandmother and assumed by Royal licence the additional surname of Mackenzie. He was a member of parliament. The Hon. James Stuart-Wortley-Mackenzie, second son of the third Earl, was a politician and the father of James Stuart-Wortley, 1st Baron Wharncliffe. Lieutenant-General Sir Charles Stuart, fourth son of the third Earl, was a distinguished soldier and the father of Charles Stuart, 1st Baron Stuart de Rothesay. The Most Reverend the Hon. William Stuart, fifth son of the third Earl, was Archbishop of Armagh. His son Sir William Stuart was a member of parliament. His eldest son William Stuart also sat as a member of parliament. Lady Louisa Stuart, daughter of the third Earl, was a writer. Lord Evelyn Stuart, second son of the first Marquess, was a soldier and politician. Lord Henry Crichton-Stuart, third son of the first Marquess, was the father of Henry Villiers-Stuart, 1st Baron Stuart de Decies (see the Baron Stuart de Decies for more information on this branch of the family).

Lord William Stuart, fourth son of the first Marquess, was a captain in the Royal Navy and Member of Parliament. Lord George Stuart (1780–1841), fifth son of the first Marquess, was a rear-admiral in the Royal Navy. Lord Dudley Stuart, sixth son of the first Marquess (and eldest from his second marriage), was a member of parliament. Lord Patrick Crichton-Stuart, second son of Lord Mount Stuart, eldest son of the first Marquess, was Member of Parliament for Cardiff. His eldest son James Crichton-Stuart also represented this constituency in Parliament. Lord Ninian Crichton-Stuart, second son of the third Marquess, was also Member of Parliament for Cardiff before his early death in the First World War. Lord Colum Crichton-Stuart, third and youngest son of the third Marquess, sat as Member of Parliament for Northwich for many years. Lord Robert Crichton-Stuart Crichton-Stuart, second son of the fourth Marquess, was Lord-Lieutenant of Buteshire. Lord Rhidian Crichton-Stuart, fifth and youngest son of the fourth Marquess, was a British member of the International Legislative Assembly of the Tangier International Zone.

The earls and marquesses of Bute originally used the courtesy title Lord Mount Stuart for the heir apparent. After the Earldom of Dumfries was inherited by the second Marquess, the heir apparent has been styled Earl of Dumfries and his heir apparent is styled Lord Mount Stuart. However, the current Marquess John Bryson Crichton-Stuart was styled as Lord Mount Stuart for some years after his father inherited the marquessate in 1993. This was because his father was well known at the time as Johnny Dumfries, Earl of Dumfries. Subsequently, the seventh Marquess became known as John or Johnny Bute and his heir adopted Jack Dumfries for short.

Heraldic achievement (coat of arms)

Seat

Mount Stuart House
Mount Stuart House is the seat of the family of the Stuarts of Bute, on land which has been in the family since 1157, on the Isle of Bute.
James Stuart, 2nd Earl of Bute, built a new Georgian house here which was finished in 1719. In 1877, this was damaged by fire, although the walls and most of the contents survived the blaze. A new Victorian Mount Stuart House was then built and was the first in Scotland to have electric lighting throughout, as well as having the world's first heated pool.

Although Mount Stuart House is the family seat of the marquesses of Bute, the Mount Stuart Trust has operated it as a business since 1989.

Former seats

Dumfries House
In 1814, Dumfries House, near Cumnock, East Ayrshire, was inherited by John Crichton-Stuart, 2nd Marquess of Bute, and the property remained in the Crichton-Stuart family for two centuries. In 1885, the 3rd Marquess of Bute commissioned Robert Weir Schultz to design the pavilions. The heads of the Crichton-Stuart family had their main residence at Mount Stuart House on the Isle of Bute. In the later 20th century, the house was lived in by the Dowager Marchioness of Bute, Lady Eileen, until her death in 1993. The 6th Marquess died a few months later, and the house passed to her grandson the 7th Marquess, the racing driver known as John Bute.

Because of maintenance problems, in 2003 the 7th Marquess decided to sell Dumfries House and to send the contents to auction. However, the Prince of Wales was able to arrange for the sale of the house, its contents, and its 2000-acre estate to a consortium of organisations, including the Scottish government, the Art Fund, the Garfield Weston Foundation, the Monument Trust, the National Heritage Memorial Fund, and Save Britain's Heritage. The Prince's Charities Foundation borrowed much of the £45m total sale price.

Cardiff Castle
The 3rd Marquess worked with the architect William Burges in creating two Gothic revival castles in south Wales. The Work of William Burges at Cardiff Castle has been remodeled from the original Roman fort and the later Norman motte-and-bailey; it has since passed through the hands of many noble families until in 1766, it passed by marriage to the Bute family. 
The 2nd Marquess of Bute was key in developing south Wales into one of the biggest coal exporters in its time by developing the port and Cardiff docks. Cardiff castle was inherited by his son John, the 3rd Marquess of Bute, who was extremely wealthy. The project begun in 1866 with the architect William Burges who transformed the castle grounds. Within the two towers one of which is a clock, he also designed expert interiors, with murals, stained glass, marble, gilding and elaborate wood carvings. The rooms included are the Mediterranean gardens and Italian, then also Arabian winter smoking room within the Herbert tower. 
Despite both previous Marquess' dying in their 50's, the project was completed by the 4th Marquess. Then after death of the 4th Marquess of Bute, the family gave away the castle and its surrounding parks to city of Cardiff. For a quarter of a century, the Castle was leased by the National College of Music and Drama, and since 1974 Cardiff Castle has become one of Wales’s most popular tourist destinations.

Castell Coch
The Herbert family ruins were acquired by the Earls of Bute in 1760 when John, 3rd Earl of Bute, married Lady Charlotte Windsor, sharing her inheritance in south Wales. His grandson, The 2nd Marquess of Bute, whose wealth came from Cardiff Docks, eventually inherited the castle. The 2nd Marquess carried out exploration for iron ore at Castell Coch in 1827 and considered establishing an ironworks there.

The 3rd Marquess of Bute, another John Crichton-Stuart, inherited Castell Coch and the family estates as a child in 1848. On his coming of age, Bute's landed estates and industrial inheritance made him one of the wealthiest men in the world. He had a wide range of interests including archaeology, theology, linguistics and history. In 1850 the antiquarian George Clark surveyed Castell Coch and published his findings, the first major scholarly work about the castle.
Castell Coch has been used for over 700 years, the previous owner were the De Clare Family. The castle was rarely used and given to the British government by the 5th Marquess in 1950.

Stuart Baronets of Bute (1627)

Sir James Stuart, 1st Baronet (died 1662)
Sir Dugald Stuart, 2nd Baronet (died 1670)
Sir James Stuart, 3rd Baronet (died 1710) (created Earl of Bute in 1703)

Earls of Bute (1703)
 James Stuart, 1st Earl of Bute (died 1710)
 James Stuart, 2nd Earl of Bute (died 1723)
 John Stuart, 3rd Earl of Bute (1713–1792)
 John Stuart, 4th Earl of Bute (1744–1814) (created Marquess of Bute in 1796)

Marquesses of Bute (1796)
John Stuart, 1st Marquess of Bute (1744–1814)
John Crichton-Stuart, 2nd Marquess of Bute (1793–1848) (had succeeded as Earl of Dumfries in 1803)
John Patrick Crichton-Stuart, 3rd Marquess of Bute (1847–1900)
John Crichton-Stuart, 4th Marquess of Bute (1881–1947)
John Crichton-Stuart, 5th Marquess of Bute (1907–1956)
John Crichton-Stuart, 6th Marquess of Bute (1933–1993)
John Colum Crichton-Stuart, 7th Marquess of Bute (1958–2021)
John Bryson Crichton-Stuart, 8th Marquess of Bute (born 1989)

Present peer
John Bryson Crichton-Stuart, 8th Marquess of Bute (born 21 December 1989) is the son of the 7th Marquess and his wife Carolyn E. R. M. Waddell. He was styled as Lord Mount Stuart from 1993.

On 22 March 2021 he succeeded his father as Marquess of Bute (G.B., 1796), Earl of Dumfries (S., 1633), Earl of Bute (S., 1703), Earl of Windsor (G.B., 1796), Viscount Air (S., 1622), Viscount Kingarth (S., 1703), Viscount Mountjoy (G.B., 1796), Lord Crichton of Sanquhar (S., 1488), Lord of Sanquhar (S., 1622), Lord Crichton of Sanquhar and Cumnock (S., 1633), Lord Mountstuart, Cumra and Inchmarnock (S., 1703), Baron Mount Stuart of Wortley (G.B., 1761), and Baron Cardiff of Cardiff Castle (G.B., 1776).
He also became the 14th Stuart baronet in the baronetage of Nova Scotia (1627).

The heir presumptive to the Marquessate of Bute is Lord Anthony Crichton-Stuart (born 1961), second son of the 6th Marquess.

The heir presumptive to the Earldom of Dumfries is Lady Caroline Crichton-Stuart (born 1984), eldest daughter of the 7th Marquess.

 John Stuart, 3rd Earl of Bute (1713–1792)
 John Stuart, 1st Marquess of Bute (1744–1814)
John Stuart, Lord Mount Stuart (1767–1794)
 John Crichton-Stuart, 2nd Marquess of Bute (1793–1848)
 John Crichton-Stuart, 3rd Marquess of Bute (1847–1900)
 John Crichton-Stuart, 4th Marquess of Bute (1881–1947)
 John Crichton-Stuart, 5th Marquess of Bute (1907–1956)
 John Crichton-Stuart, 6th Marquess of Bute (1933–1993)
 John Crichton-Stuart, 7th Marquess of Bute (1958–2021)
 John Crichton-Stuart, 8th Marquess of Bute (b. 1989)
(1). Lord Anthony Crichton-Stuart (b. 1961)
(2). Arthur Alec Crichton-Stuart (b. 2001)
Lord David Ogden Crichton-Stuart (1933–1977)
(3). Kenneth Edward David Crichton-Stuart (b. 1975)
Lord James Charles Crichton-Stuart (1935–1982)
(4). William Henry Crichton-Stuart (b. 1971)
(5). Hugh Bertram Crichton-Stuart (b. 1973)
(6). Alexander Blane Crichton-Stuart (b. 1982)
(7). James Callum Crichton-Stuart (b. 2014)
Lord Robert Crichton-Stuart (1909–1976)
Henry Colum Crichton-Stuart  (1938–2019)
male issue in succession
Lord Patrick Crichton-Stuart (1913–1956)
Charles Patrick Colum Henry Crichton-Stuart (1939–2001)
male issue in succession
Lord Rhidian Crichton-Stuart (1917–1969)
Frederick John Patrick Crichton-Stuart (1940–2011)
male issue in succession
Lord Ninian Crichton-Stuart (1883–1915)
Michael Duncan David Crichton-Stuart (1915–1981)
Ninian Stuart (b. 1957)
male issue in succession
Lord Patrick Crichton-Stuart (1794–1859)
James Crichton-Stuart (1824–1891)
Patrick James Crichton-Stuart (1868–1935)
Patrick Dudley Crichton-Stuart (1909–1978)
male issue in succession
Lord Henry Stuart (1777–1809)
William Villiers-Stuart (1804–1873)
Henry John Richard Villiers-Stuart (1837–1914)
John Patrick Villiers-Stuart (1879–1958)
John Michael Villiers-Stuart (1927–1986)
male issue in succession
Lord George Stuart (1780–1841)
James Stuart-Wortley-Mackenzie (1747–1818)
line of Barons and Earls of Wharncliffe

Barons Mount Stuart (1761) 
 Mary Stuart, 1st Baroness Mount Stuart (1718–1794)
 John Crichton-Stuart, 4th Earl of Bute, 2nd Baron Mount Stuart (1744–1814) (created Marquess of Bute in 1796)
see above for further succession

Family tree

See also
Earl of Dumfries
Viscount Windsor
Earl of Wharncliffe
Baron Stuart de Decies
Baron Stuart of Wortley
Stuart Baronets
Clan Stuart of Bute

References

Sources

 
 
 
 

Marquessates in the Peerage of Great Britain
History of Cardiff
Lists of nobility

Noble titles created in 1796
1796 establishments in Great Britain
Clan Stewart